Buzcheh-ye Olya (also Romanized as Būzcheh-ye ‘Olyā; also known as Būjeh-ye Bālā and Būzjeh-ye ‘Olyā) is a village in Aslan Duz Rural District, Aslan Duz District, Parsabad County, Ardabil Province, Iran. At the 2006 census, its population was 122, in 26 families. The village is populated by the Kurdish Chalabianlu tribe.

References 

Towns and villages in Parsabad County
Kurdish settlements in East Azerbaijan Province